The sixth season of I'm a Celebrity...Get Me Out of Here was commissioned by Network Ten on 7 February 2019 and premiered on 5 January 2020. It was hosted by Julia Morris and Chris Brown.

Teaser
The first teaser trailer, which revealed Miguel Maestre as a contestant, was released on 5 November 2019.

Celebrities

Celebrity guests

Results and elimination
 Indicates that the celebrity received the most votes from the public
 Indicates that the celebrity was immune from the vote
 Indicates that the celebrity was named as being in the bottom 2 or 3.
 Indicates that the celebrity received the fewest votes and was evicted immediately (no bottom three)
 Indicates that the celebrity withdrew from the competition

Tucker Trials
The contestants take part in daily trials to earn food. These trials aim to test both physical and mental abilities. Success is usually determined by the number of stars collected during the trial, with each star representing a meal earned by the winning contestant for their camp mates.

 The public voted for who they wanted to face the trial
 The contestants decided who did which trial
 The trial was compulsory and neither the public nor celebrities decided who took part 
 The contestants were chosen by the evicted celebrities
 The voting for the trial was of dual origin

Notes
 There were two tucker trials on the first day, with the celebrities entering the jungle in two groups of five. The first group had to bungee jump off a helicopter in Falling Stars while the other group were involved in a second tucker trial, where Erin was confined in a coffin and the other four celebrities had to answer trivia questions & retrieve bags of treasure from "hell holes" to free Erin.
 As intruders, Billy and Dale were required to complete the trial as part of their entry into camp.
 Nikki had severe vertigo after being spun multiple times, so she said the words "I'm A Celebrity...Get Me Out of Here!" after the sixth round which ended the challenge.
 Billy and Ryan were automatically placed in the compulsory trial while Rhonda was voted into the trial by the public.
 Perez, as an intruder, had to complete the Viper Room trial as part of his entry into camp.
 Charlotte, Perez and Ryan had to drop a pickle onto a giant bun while bungee jumping, which they all failed to complete on their initial attempts. Because Perez was the only celebrity who was able to attempt the challenge, the producers decided to give him another attempt to win the full slate of stars.
 In the trial, each star was worth ½ meal, so this meant Charlotte and Miguel won 5½ meals for dinner.

Star count

Superhero Sundays
In the sixth season, Superhero Sundays were introduced (replacing The Sunday Slam), in which a group of celebrities would participate in a superhero themed trial each Sunday. These challenges include Dreadmill, The Scariest Trial We've Ever Done! and Buns of Steel.

Camp Master & Minion
The Camp Master was able to sleep on a Bedshed bed and have breakfast including toast & eggs while the Camp Minion had to do everything that the Master asked them to do.

Secret Missions
This is a challenge in which celebrities have to take part in something without alerting the other celebrities to what they are doing.

The Camp's Secret Mission: Shake Things Up
In episode 8, all of the camp mates (except for Miguel) were given McCafé Real Coffee Shakes which they had to finish drinking without Miguel finding out. The camp were successful in their challenge and therefore won Miguel his own Real Coffee Shake.

Dale's Secret Mission: Fake Bum Challenge
Dale had to complete a series of missions without being detected wearing a series of fake bums, which each became progressively larger every round. These missions included making his bed, looking for a lost item under the bed closest to the stage and hugging Tom. He was successful in completing the challenges and won the camp a bowl of peaches.

The Camp's Challenge: Tweet for Treat
The camp had to guess which tweet applied to which contestant, whose name was blanked out on the sheet of paper. The celebrities gained enough correct answers to win s'mores for the camp.

Ryan & Dale's Secret Missions
In episode 17 and 18, Ryan and Dale were required to leave camp each morning to complete two Carnival Cruise Line themed missions which included indulging themselves to a "Carnival breakfast buffet" and a "romantic relaxation massage" at the Cloud 9 Spa. As the other camp members were unsuspecting of them completing a mission, the camp received a reward which was dinner at the Carnival pub.

Ratings

Ratings data is from OzTAM and represents the live and same day average viewership from the 5 largest Australian metropolitan centres (Sydney, Melbourne, Brisbane, Perth and Adelaide).

References

06
2020 Australian television seasons